Macrocoma setosa is a species of leaf beetle found in Algeria and Morocco  It was first described by Hippolyte Lucas in 1846, as a species of Pseudocolaspis.

Subspecies
There are two subspecies of M. setosa:

 Macrocoma setosa mesatlantica Kocher, 1959: Found in Morocco. Inhabits the Middle Atlas range.
 Macrocoma setosa setosa (H. Lucas, 1846): The nominotypical subspecies. Found in Algeria and Morocco.

References

setosa
Beetles of North Africa
Taxa named by Hippolyte Lucas
Beetles described in 1846